Gölbaşı District is a district of Adıyaman Province of Turkey. Its seat is the town Gölbaşı. Its area is 800 km2, and its population is 50,150 (2021). There are three lakes in the area: Lake Gölbaşı, Lake Azaplı and Lake İnekli.

Composition
There are 4 municipalities in Gölbaşı District:
Balkar
Belören
Gölbaşı
Harmanlı

There are 30 villages in Gölbaşı District:

 Akçabel
 Akçakaya
 Aktoprak
 Aşağıazaplı
 Aşağıkarakuyu
 Aşağınasırlı
 Bağlarbaşı
 Cankara
 Çatalağaç
 Çataltepe
 Çelikköy
 Gedikli
 Hacılar
 Hamzalar
 Haydarlı
 Karabahşılı
 Karaburun
 Kösüklü
 Küçükören
 Meydan
 Örenli
 Ozan
 Savran
 Yarbaşı
 Yaylacık
 Yeniköy
 Yeşilova
 Yukarıçöplü
 Yukarıkarakuyu
 Yukarınasırlı

References

Districts of Adıyaman Province